The Johnny Alegre AFFINITY is a jazz group originating from the Philippines. It is led by self-taught Philippine guitarist-composer Johnny Alegre, together with bassist Colby de la Calzada, drummer Koko Bermejo, pianist Elhmir Saison and saxophonist Tots Tolentino. The ensemble first gathered in May 2002 at Manila’s Pink Noise Studios for Alegre’s composition, “Stones of Intramuros”, for inclusion in the jazz anthology CD, Adobo Jazz: A Portrait of the Filipino as a Jazz Artist, Vol. 1, and thereafter carried on as a working unit.

The band's first public appearance in October of the same year for the Adobo Jazz album launch at the Monk's Dream Jazz Bar heralded the AFFINITY's reputation – as described by aficionados in the ensuing reviews — as “Manila’s Jazz Superband”, with a power trio at its core. For the remainder of the year, the group emerged in various guises and personnel variations, manned by a who's who of luminaries from the Philippine jazz scene.

In 2003, the original quintet that recorded “Stones of Intramuros” returned to the studio to record new compositions by Alegre; followed by a succession of other dates leading to the release of the eponymous album, Johnny Alegre AFFINITY, renamed Jazzhound, by the London-based jazz specialty label, Candid Records (UK).

The band was prominently featured at the annual Fête de la Musique and the Korg Music Festival. In November, the Johnny Alegre AFFINITY inaugurated their new compositions and arrangements before an enthusiastic jazz audience at the University of the Philippines Theatre, which was subsequently broadcast, live, on prime time over national television. This national debut performance was also issued as a DVD by the sponsoring Upsilon Sigma Phi fraternity and had since been included in a historical documentary of Philippine Jazz, issued by the Jazz Society of the Philippines. In 2004, AFFINITY once again became the focal point of two major jazz concert events, the Makati Jazz Festival celebrating its Foundation Day; and the 2nd Manila Jazz Festival.

In 2005, through critical support matched by impressive album sales, Candid Records ushered the Manila “jazz superband” through a tour of stellar performances (highlighted by a formal launch at the famed Ayala Museum), capped by two groundbreaking performances at London's PizzaExpress Jazz Club. Their repeat performance in the 3rd Manila Jazz Festival was subsequently issued as a DVD by the Jewelmer Corporation. A new Candid Records release, entitled Eastern Skies, was launched in December 2007 featuring AFFINITY amidst big band and symphonic arrangements by orchestrator Ria Osorio featuring the music of Johnny Alegre with the Global Studio Orchestra, conducted by Gerard Salonga.

Nominations

Awards
Conferred on Johnny Alegre as leader

Discography

Videography

References

External links

 
Candid Records Artist roster
Johnny Alegre AFFINITY on Spotify
Johnny Alegre AFFINITY on Discogs
Johnny Alegre AFFINITY on Asian Rock Rising
Johnny Alegre AFFINITY deluxe edition on Amazon

Candid Records artists
Filipino jazz ensembles
Musical groups established in 2002
Musical groups from Metro Manila